Botswana has competed at ten Commonwealth Games, with the first coming in 1974. They did not participate in the 1978 Commonwealth Games, but have attended all nine since. Botswana have won twelve medals, with six of these coming in boxing. Their most successful Games were 2010 when they won four medals, including Botswana's first ever gold, won by Amantle Montsho.

Medals

References

 
Nations at the Commonwealth Games